The 1892 American Cup was the eighth edition of the soccer tournament organized by the American Football Association. The Fall River East Ends won their second title in succession by overcoming the New York Thistles in the final. The Challenge Cup committee elected by the AFA were Robert Miller of O.N.T. as President, James Henderson of Brooklyn Nonpareil as Vice President, Thomas B. Hood of Pawtucket as Secretary, and John Lang of Fall River as Treasurer.

Entrants

Western Circuit:
 AtlanticsBrooklyn, New York
 BrooklynNew York
 ComradesBrooklyn, New York
 LongfellowsBrooklyn, New York
 NonpareilsBrooklyn, New York
 ThistlesNew York
 CalendoniansNewark, New Jersey
 O.N.T.Newark, New Jersey
 PatersonNew Jersey
 ThistlePaterson, New Jersey
 True BluesPaterson, New Jersey
 TrentonNew Jersey

Eastern Circuit:
 CanonicutsFall River, Massachusetts
 East EndsFall River, Massachusetts
 OlympicsFall River, Massachusetts
 RoversFall River, Massachusetts
 Free WanderersPawtucket, Rhode Island
 Metropole A.A.Providence, Rhode Island
 QuincyQuincy, Massachusetts 
 Barre RangersBarre, Vermont

First round
The first round draw took place at the AFA meeting in Newark, New Jersey on September 13, 1891. The games of the first round were scheduled to be played on or before the last Saturday in October. The replay of the Canonicut-Metrople match was protested on account of darkness. The subsequent replay was tied, however the tie was not replayed because Metropole, by then, had disbanded. The Brooklyn-Thistle replay was also protested and resolved with a third encounter. The Free Wanderers and East Ends also required three tries to complete the round. The first match was called on account of rough play and ordered replayed on neutral ground while the second match was protested regarding a disputed goal.

Thistle: G Cameron, FB Flynn, Noble, HB Purvis, Enwistle, Head, FW Jameson, Scott, Adams, Fife, Frazier. Brooklyn: G M.Gorevin(c), FB C.Gorevin, Thompson, HB Simm, McLarne, Nork, FW Smith, Neil, Paul, Crabb, Hinshaw.

Trenton: GK J.Kearns, FB W.Duffy, G.Allman, HB R.McDavitt, W.Cooper, J.Gallagher, RW R.Rhodes, G.Harvey, C Jim Irwin, LW A.Cartlidge, J.Birch. Caledonian: GK W.Shaw, FB John Brown, F.McDonald, HB Bennett(c), Crann, F.Britchford, RW H.Fisher, John Singleton, C William Barr, LW John Swithemby, Ed Morgan, Reserves R.Paterson, J.Burns, W,Clark.

Longfellows: GK Gnider, FB Foy, Leonard, HB McConnell, Neave, McCallion, RW R.Rhodes, G.Harvey, C J.Green, LW Boyle, F.Gammell. Atlantics: GK Graham, FB Achon, Wayne, HB Paterson, North, Adams, RW Scott, Bailey, C J.Dunbar, LW Dumbart, Thornton.

Paterson: GK S.Simpson, FB J.Henshall(c), D.Grant, HB R.Sinclair, J.Worseley, J.T.Robinson, FW Unwin, Fiddler, S.Turner, W.Clarkson, J.Counsell. True Blues: GK S.Templeton, FB J.Lockman(c), W.Pearson, HB F.Binks, C.Alsopp, E.Ackerman, FW W.Nield, J.Bond, T.Nield, W.Vernon, W.McDonald, A.Bray.

Metropole: GK Croan, FB M. Muirhead, Boyer, HB Manion, Tom Muirhead, Johnson, RW Hellborn, Fields, C McDonald, LW Murray, Cloud. Conanicuts: GK Farrell, FB Dillon, Ryan, HB Gillette, Morgan, Donovan, RW Bennett, (absent), C McNulty, LW Griffin, Levecque.

Wanderers: GK McFarland, FB Read, Fagan(c), HB A.Jenkins, Guy, Attewell, RW McCann, Davis, C Howard, LW O'Neil, Smith. East Ends: GK Irving, FB Morris, Hargeaves, HB Scott(c), Stanton, Hughes, RW Philbin, Tobin, C Whitehead, LW Sunderland, Borden.

replays

Metropole: GK Croan, FB M. Muirhead, Bowyer, HB Manion, Tom Muirhead, Johnson, RW Fisk, Cook, C McDonald, LW Murray, Hellborne. Conanicuts: GK Farrell, FB Cusick, Ryan, HB Dillon, Culligan, Kearney, RW Bennett, Hoctor, C Stanton, LW McNulty, Levecque.

Thistle: G Cameron, FB Patrick, Ritchie, HB Flynn, Entwistle, Noble, RW Jamieson, Robertson, C Adams, LW Purvis, Frazer. Brooklyn: G M.Gorvin(c), FB C.Gorvin, Thompson, HB Crabb, Farrell, Henshaw, RW North, McLaren, LW Smith, Paul, C Patterson.

Rovers: G Simester, FB H.Adams, King, HB Adams, Puleston, Culligan, RW Farrell, J.Harrington, C Harrington, LW Kenny, Gavan. Olympics: G Connell, FB Stuart, Lee, HB Burgess, Finn, Tomlinson, RW Pilling, Booth, LW Randell(c), Russell, C Miller.

Wanderers: GK McFarlane, FB Read, Fagan(c), HB McConnell, Guy, Sam Jenkins, RW McCann, Davis, C A.Jenkins, LW O'Neil, Mullarkey. East Ends: GK Irving, FB Morris, Hargraves, HB Scott(c), Stanton, Hughes, RW Philbin, Tobin, C Whitehead, LW Sunderland, Bowden, Reserves McGuigan, Shorrocks, Schofield, Thomas.

Metropole: GK Manion, FB M. Muirhead, Bowyer, HB Brown, Tom Muirhead, Johnson, RW Hellborn, Cash, C McDonald, LW Murray, Smith. Conanicuts: GK Farrell, FB Morgan, Ryan, HB Gillet, Dillon, Oldham, RW Bennett, Hoctor, C Puleston, LW McNulty, Leveque.

Thistle: G Cameron, FB Flynn, Patrick, HB Duncan, Entwistle, Millen, RW Jamison, Scott, C Adams, LW Purvis, Frazer. Brooklyn: G M.Gorevin, FB C.Gorevin, Iszet, HB Court, McLaren, McGuire, RW H.North, C Farrell, Paul, LW Neil, Smith.

Wanderers: GK McFarlane, FB Read, Fagan(c), HB McConnell, Guy, Sam Jenkins, RW McCann, Davis, C A.Jenkins, LW O'Neil, Montgomery. East Ends: GK Irving, FB Morris, Hargraves, HB Scott(c), Philbin, Hughes, RW Stanton, Tobin, C Whitehead, LW Sunderland, Bowden, Reserves McGuigan, Shorrocks, Schofield, Thomas.

Second round
The Paterson Thistles protest was sustained in their match with the Longfellows and ordered replayed.

Thistle: GK G.Cummings, FB T.Turner, D.Young, HB W.Ritchie, R.Stevenson, R.Richmond, FW McCanle, A.Findley, T.Cairns, J.Turner, W.Turner.

O.N.T.: GK P.Hughes, FB H.Holden, G.Walker, HB J.Hood, J.William, J.Shelby, FW R.Stewart, Hood, Hughes, Haworth, Rook. True Blues: GK S.Templeton, FB Ross, W.Pearson, HB J.Hall, H.Finley, A.Ackerman, FW W.Nield, S.Saunders, T.Nield, W.Vernon, W.McDonald, A.Bray.

Caledonian: GK Patrick Flynn, FB John Brown, Thomas Kirk, HB Frank McDonald, A.Burno, F.Britchford, FW William Bennett(c), John Singleton, C William Barr, LW John Swithemby, Edward Morgan, Reserves John Sankey, Ernest James, Walter Taylor, W.Shaw. Thistle: G Cameron, FB Patrick, Ritchie, HB Flynn, Entwistle, Hines, FW Jameson, Scott, Adams, Fraser, Purvis.

Rovers: GK Simester, FB Adams, King, HB William Barlow, Puleston, Culligan, RW Farrell, Gavin, C M.Harrington, LW Kenny, J.Harrington. East Ends: GK Irving, FB Morris, Hargraves, HB Scott, Philbin, Stanton, RW Whitehead, Tobin, C Boyd, LW Sunderland, Bowden, Reserves McGuiggan, Sharrocks.

replay

Third Round
Thistles drew a bye.

Conanicuts: GK Dennis Shay, FB Buckley, Cusick, HB Whittaker, Cutler, Lagrosse, RW Bell, Bannister, C Gillette, LW Griffin, Leveque. East Ends: GK Irving, FB Boyd, Gregory, HB Scott, Philbin, Hughes, RW P.Stanton, Tobin, C Jeffrey, LW Sunderland, Bowden.

Semifinal

Final

East Ends: GK Irving, FB Morris, Gregory, HB Scott, Hughes, Philbin, RW Jeffrey, Tobin, C Boyd, LW Sunderland, Bowden. Thistle: G Cameron, FB Patrick, Ritchie, HB Wiley, Entwistle, Duncan, RW Jameson, Scott, C Flynn, LW Fraser, McKinley.

References 

1892